Sakata Station is the name of multiple train stations in Japan:

 Sakata Station (Shiga) - (坂田駅) in Shiga Prefecture
 Sakata Station (Yamagata) - (酒田駅) in Yamagata Prefecture